Randy Lewis may refer to:

Randy Lewis (executive), businessman and disability advocate
Randy Lewis (racing driver) (born 1945), American Indianapolis 500 driver
Randy Lewis (wrestler) (born 1959), American former Olympic champion wrestler
Randy Lewis (triple jumper) (born 1978), Grenadian triple jumper
Randy Lewis, music critic for the Los Angeles Times